Hermathena oweni, the peppered metalmark, is a species of butterfly in genus Hermathena of the family Riodinidae. It was first described by William Schaus in 1913. This rare montane forest species is found from southern Mexico to Costa Rica.

References

External links
"Hermathena oweni Schaus 1913". Tree of Life Web Project.
"Hermathena oweni Schaus, 1913 (Peppered Metalmark)". Butterflies of America
"Hermathena oweni". Animal Diversity Web.

Riodinidae
Butterflies described in 1913
Taxa named by William Schaus